Huang Wen-hsing (born 2 June 1979) is a Taiwanese Hokkien pop singer and actor. He was named the Best Taiwanese Male Singer at the 2011 Golden Melody Awards. He has appeared in several television series, including Love or Bread (2008), Monga Yao Hui (2011), and In The Family (2017).

References

External links

 
 
 

1979 births
Living people
Taiwanese male television actors
Taiwanese male film actors
Taiwanese Hokkien pop singers
21st-century Taiwanese male actors
People from Pingtung County
21st-century Taiwanese  male singers